The 2011 FIA Formula Two Championship season was the third year of the FIA Formula Two Championship. The championship began on 17 April at Silverstone and finished on 30 October at the Circuit de Catalunya, after eight double-header rounds and all (excluding Silverstone) in support of International GT Open racing weekends.

For most of the season, the championship battle revolved around a returning driver Mirko Bortolotti (finished fourth in 2009 and rookie driver Christopher Zanella. Bortolotti took lead after win in the opening race of the season at Silverstone and did not leave him until the end of the season. The Italian secured his title and a prize test for the Williams F1 team in the home race at Monza with two races to spare. Bortolotti scored seven wins in a season matching 2009 Champion Andy Soucek record and with win in 2009 at Brno the Italian took absolute win record in FIA Formula Two Championship.

Zanella finished a second place in the standings with two wins, 123 points behind Bortolotti and just eight ahead of his nearest rival and another newcomer Ramón Piñeiro, who scored three wins. The fourth place went to Piñeiro compatriot and winner of the Silverstone's race Miki Monrás.

Drivers

Driver changes
 Entering/Re–Entering FIA Formula Two Championship
 José Luis Abadín graduated from European F3 Open to compete in the championship.
 Mirko Bortolotti, Alex Brundle and Tobias Hegewald all returned to the championship, after competing in other series in 2010. Bortolotti and Hegewald moved back from the GP3 Series, while Brundle will rejoin from British Formula 3.
 James Cole moved into the series from the British Formula 3 National Class. Max Snegirev also joined Formula Two from the Championship Class in British Formula 3.
 Formula Renault NEC runner-up Mikkel Mac moved into Formula Two in 2011.
 Miki Monrás switched from GP3 Series to compete in the championship.
 Sung-Hak Mun joined the championship after racing in Formula BMW Pacific in 2010.
 Thiemo Storz moved into the championship, having missed most of 2010 due to completing his schooling and competing in the last Formula Palmer Audi season.
 After finishing sixth in the Italian Formula Three Championship, Christopher Zanella graduated into Formula Two in 2011.

 Leaving FIA Formula Two Championship
 2010 champion Dean Stoneman had been due to compete with ISR Racing in the Formula Renault 3.5 Series in 2011, but withdrew after being diagnosed with testicular cancer.
 2010 runner-up Jolyon Palmer graduated to GP2, signing with the Arden International team. Palmer returned to Formula Two at the Nürburgring, in order to gain track time ahead of the GP2 races at the circuit later in the season.
 Sergey Afanasyev, who finished third in 2010 moved to Auto GP with DAMS.

Mid-Season Changes
 Jordan King, Jon Lancaster and Fabio Gamberini joined the series during the season. Lancaster contested the Magny-Cours round, after racing in the Formula Renault 3.5 Series during the 2010 season, while King is combining his Formula Two programme with Formula Renault UK. Gamberini, a front-runner in the European F3 Open series, competed at the Nürburgring.

Calendar
An eight-round calendar was published on 3 November 2010, with an amendment made to the Magny-Cours date on 8 December 2010. The series was not part of the support package of the World Touring Car Championship as it had been since the series' revival. With the exception of the opening round at Silverstone, the championship was a part of International GT Open meetings.

Championship standings
A driver's best 14 scores counted towards the championship, with any other points being discarded.

References

External links
 The official website of the FIA Formula Two Championship

FIA Formula Two Championship seasons
FIA Formula Two season
FIA Formula Two season
Formula Two